WARO is a commercial radio station located in Fort Myers, Florida, licensed to Naples, Florida, broadcasting to the Fort Myers/Naples area on 94.5 FM.  WARO airs a classic rock music format branded as "94.5 The Arrow". The station previously broadcast an all-1970s music format until approximately 2003.

Its transmitter is located east of I-75 near Bonita Springs in southern Lee County.

From 1996 to January 27, 2012, Sun Broadcasting was known as Meridian Broadcasting, Inc

External links
 Official website
Broadcast Center | Fort Myers Broadcasting Co. | Sun Broadcasting, Inc.

ARO
Classic rock radio stations in the United States
1962 establishments in Florida
Radio stations established in 1962